This is a list of all Lords and Counts of Egmont or Egmond.

Lords of Egmont
 Radbold
 Wolbrand
 Dodo I (?–?)
 Walger (?–1036)
 Dodo II (?–1074)
 Beerwout or Berwoud I (?–1114)
 Beerwout or Berwoud II (c. 1095–1158)
 Albrecht/Albert (c. 1130–1168)
 Dodo III (c. 1130–1200)
 Wouter / Walter I (1158–1208)
 Willem / William I (c. 1180–1234)
 Gerard / Gerald I (c. 1200–1242)
 Willem / William (c. 1235–1304) 
 Willem / William III (1281–1312)
 Wouter / Walter II (1283–1321)
 Jan / John I (1310–1369)
 Arent / Arnoud / Arnold (1337–1409)
 Jan / John II (1384–1451)
 Willem / William IV (1412–1483)

Counts of Egmont
 Jan / John III (or I) (1438–1516)
 Jan / John IV (or II) (1499–1528)
 Karel/Charles I (?–1541) )
 Lamoraal / Lamoral I (1522–1568), whose execution contributed to the outbreak of the Eighty Years' War
 Filips/Philip (1559–1590)
 Lamoral II (????–1617)
 Charles II (1567–1620)
 Louis (1600–1654)
 Louis Philip (1630–1682)

References

House of Egmond
Counts of Egmond
Dutch nobility
Belgian nobility